Elsa Viktoria Olenius (September 30, 1896 – August 25, 1984) was a Swedish librarian and writer, best remembered for pioneering children's library activities and theatre with children.

In the 1940s, she founded  ('the Children's Own Theatre'), which later became Vår teater ('Our Theatre').

Biography

Upbringing and studies 
Elsa Olenius was born in 1896 in Bollnäs, Hälsingland, Sweden. She was the only child of Otto Söderström, a postal inspector, and Blenda Johnson. Both her parents were interested in theatre and her father was also an amateur musician. When the family moved to Örebro, Olenius was introduced to the theatre as a child. She later performed at the gymnasium theatre and then at the student theatre in Uppsala, where she graduated from the Uppsala private gymnasium in 1914 at the age of 17.

In 1919, she married Nils Edvin Olenius (1893–1964), a customs inspector.

Between 1925 and 1927, Olenius was a student at the Stockholm Children's and Youth Library, and on 16 December 1927 she was hired at the second branch of the Stockholm City Library on Hornsgatan in Södermalm.

Olenius has been described as author Astrid Lindgren's "friend and mentor".

Professional life 
As a children's librarian at Hornsgatan Library, Olenius began holding storytelling events for children, and in the 1930s she began her children's theatre activities, in which children were actively involved through drama and pantomime.

In 1942, with the support of the Social Democratic Municipal Commissioner, Oscar Larsson, Olenius was able to take over a room in the civic hall Medborgarhuset, where Ingmar Bergman had previously directed plays for both children and adults. There, Olenius began an open house for the children of Södermalm on Saturdays. Children between the ages of seven and sixteen could try pantomime theatre and improvisation to music, as a continuation and expansion of the storytelling sessions. It was first called  ('the Children's Own Theatre'), and then Vår teater ('Our Theatre') from 1955, when the children's theatre activities became an institution in their own right within the Children's Welfare Board, with new branches in the suburbs of Stockholm. Olenius then conducted a theatre management course to provide them with trained theatre managers. She also published several collections of plays to be performed by children, with the aim of promoting their personalities and development.

She was also on the jury of the Rabén & Sjögren screenplay competition, where Astrid Lindgren's first book The Confidences of Britt-Mari won second prize.

In 1958, Olenius was appointed to the first children's theatre consultant position established in Sweden.

Olenius died in Danderyd in 1984 and is buried in Norra begravningsplatsen.

Bibliography

Awards 

 Expressen's  (1979)
  (1981)
 Litteraturfrämjandet's Vingpennan (1981)
 Bengt Hjelmqvist Prize (1984)

References 

1896 births
1984 deaths
Swedish writers
Swedish librarians
Swedish theatre people
Children's theatre